This is a list of municipalities in New York, which includes all 534 villages and 62 cities of New York. Of the 534 villages and 62 cities, there are 596 municipalities in New York.

At the time of the 2010 United States Census, the state of New York had 555 villages. Since then, 21 villages were dissolved (four in Cattaraugus County, three in Oneida County, two each in Chautauqua County, St. Lawrence County and Wayne County, one each in Essex County, Jefferson County, Seneca County, Washington County and Oswego County as well as Keeseville in Clinton and Essex counties), while one new village was created in Suffolk County (Mastic Beach).  After only seven years of being incorporated, the Village of Mastic Beach dissolved on December 31, 2017. The village of Van Etten in Chemung County and the village of Harrisville in Lewis County were both dissolved on December 31, 2018, while the village of Morristown in St. Lawrence County was dissolved on December 31, 2019. The village of South Nyack, New York was dissolved in 2022.

Most municipalities in New York are located within a single town and county, but some municipalities are located in more than one town. Of those, there are ten municipalities located in more than one county:
 Almond (Allegany & Steuben Counties)
 Attica (Genesee & Wyoming Counties)
 Deposit (Broome & Delaware Counties)
 Dolgeville (Fulton & Herkimer Counties)
 Geneva (Ontario & Seneca Counties)
 Gowanda (Cattaraugus & Erie Counties)
 New York (Bronx, Kings, New York, Queens & Richmond Counties)
 Rushville (Ontario & Yates Counties)
 Saranac Lake (Essex & Franklin Counties)

Extremes in size and population 

The least populous city is Sherrill, with just 3,071 inhabitants.

 Smallest village, by area: South Floral Park – 
 Largest village, by area: Speculator – 
 Smallest village, by population: Dering Harbor – 50 (2020)
 Largest village, by population: Hempstead – 59,169 (2020)

Former villages 

Listed below are former villages in the State of New York which either dissolved, consolidated or were acquired by another municipality between 1900 and 2018. To date during this period, there are a total of 47 villages that have chosen dissolution with more expected in the upcoming years. A former village does have the option to re-incorporate in the future if the community chooses to do so. Unless otherwise specified, these communities are currently (or will be) considered census-designated places by the U.S. Census Bureau.

Gallery

See also

 List of city nicknames in New York
 Administrative divisions of New York
 List of counties in New York
 List of towns in New York
 List of census-designated places in New York

Footnotes

^ Geneva is located within both the counties of Ontario and Seneca, although the section in Seneca County has no population and is all water.
^ 1653 is the officially recognized date. Peter Stuyvesant convinced the States General of the Netherlands to charter the city of Nieuw Amsterdam in 1653.  The English envoy, Richard Nicolls, renamed the city "New York" two days after capturing it in 1664.  Provincial governor Thomas Dongan rechartered the city under the auspices of the Duke of York in 1683, though the charter was not published until 1686.  Finally, New York was reincorporated to include all five of its present boroughs in 1898.

References

New York, List of cities in
Cities